Harrison Township is one of ten townships in Knox County, Indiana. As of the 2010 census, its population was 1,916 and it contained 812 housing units.

History
Harrison Township was founded in 1801. It was named for General William Henry Harrison, an American military officer and ninth President of the United States.

Geography

References

External links
 Indiana Township Association
 United Township Association of Indiana

Townships in Knox County, Indiana
Townships in Indiana